Alexandra Federica Guzmán Diamante, (born May 23, 1981) is a Venezuelan TV Host, model and beauty pageant titleholder who won Miss Venezuela World 2006.

Guzmán competed as Miss Miranda in Miss Venezuela 2001 (and the preceding Miss World Venezuela 2001) without success.  The altered schedule of the Miss World 2006 pageant forced the Miss Venezuela Organization to prepare an "emergency pageant" to select a candidate. She proceeded to compete for the title of Miss World 2006 on the night of September 30, 2006, in the Americas group but failed to make the final cut. The winner of Miss World Americas 2006 title was Miss Brazil.

External links
Federica @ Bellas Venezolanas

References

1981 births
People from Caracas
Miss Venezuela World winners
Miss World 2006 delegates
Living people
Venezuelan female models